Shirine Boukli (born 24 January 1999) is a French judoka. She won the gold medal in the women's 48 kg event at the European Judo Championships in 2020 and 2022.

Career
In January 2020, she won the silver medal in the women's 48 kg event at the Judo Grand Prix Tel Aviv held in Tel Aviv, Israel and, a month later, she won the gold medal in that event at the Judo Grand Slam Düsseldorf held in Düsseldorf, Germany.

She won the gold medal in the women's 48 kg event at the 2020 European Judo Championships held in Prague, Czech Republic.

In 2021, she competed in the women's 48 kg event at the Judo World Masters held in Doha, Qatar. A month later, she won the gold medal in her event at the 2021 Judo Grand Slam Tel Aviv held in Tel Aviv, Israel. In June 2021, she competed in the women's 48 kg event at the World Judo Championships held in Budapest, Hungary.

She represented France at the 2020 Summer Olympics in Tokyo, Japan. She competed in the women's 48 kg event where she was eliminated in her first match.

At the 2021 Judo Grand Slam Abu Dhabi held in Abu Dhabi, United Arab Emirates, she won the silver medal in her event. She won the gold medal in her event at the 2022 Judo Grand Slam Tel Aviv held in Tel Aviv, Israel.

She won the gold medal in the women's 48 kg event at the 2022 European Judo Championships held in Sofia, Bulgaria.

Achievements

References

External links
 
 
 

Living people
1999 births
Place of birth missing (living people)
French female judoka
Judoka at the 2020 Summer Olympics
Olympic judoka of France
21st-century French women